Charles Price may refer to:
Charles Price (Protestant), 16th-century Protestant
Charles Price (Royalist) (died 1645), Welsh soldier and politician
Sir Charles Price, 1st Baronet (1747–1818), British merchant and politician
Sir Charles Price, 2nd Baronet (1776–1847), British banker
Charles Price (Old Patch) (died 1787), otherwise 'Old Patch', was a prolific English forger and swindler
Charles Price (minister) (1807–1891), English-born Congregational minister in colonial Tasmania
Charles Edward Price (1857–1934), British Member of Parliament for Edinburgh Central, 1924–1929
Charles Basil Price (1890–1975), Canadian soldier
Charles C. Price (1913–2001), American chemist
Charles F. Price (born 1938), American non-fiction author
Charles F. B. Price (1881–1954), lieutenant general of the United States Marine Corps
Charles Melvin Price (1905–1988), U.S. Congressman
Charles H. Price II (1931–2012), American businessman and former diplomat
Charles Price (Welsh politician) (1872–1954), British Member of Parliament for Pembrokeshire, 1906–1918
Charles Price (Canadian politician) (1888–1957), member of the Legislative Assembly of New Brunswick
SS Charles S. Price, a steel-hulled ship lost on Lake Huron on November 9, 1913 during the Great Lakes storm of 1913